Kazai Suzanne Kragbé (born 22 December 1981) is an Ivorian athlete specializing in the discus throw. She competed twice at the World Championships in Athletics failing to progress to the final.

Her personal best in the event is 59.32 metres from 2011. She was the gold medalist at the 2011 All-Africa Games and the 2013 Jeux de la Francophonie. She has also been twice runner-up and twice bronze medalist at the African Championships in Athletics.

Competition records

External links
 

1981 births
Living people
Ivorian discus throwers
Female discus throwers
Ivorian female athletes
World Athletics Championships athletes for Ivory Coast
African Games gold medalists for Ivory Coast
African Games medalists in athletics (track and field)
Athletes (track and field) at the 2007 All-Africa Games
Athletes (track and field) at the 2011 All-Africa Games